Netta is a short form of many names ending -netta, including Aquanetta, Arnetta, Dawnetta, Janetta and Jenetta, as part of the largest etymological root of names with over five hundred variations, both male and female.  Notable people with this name include the following:

Given name
 Netta Aloni (born 1945), Israeli composer
 Netta Barzilai (born 1993), Israeli singer also known mononymously as Netta
 Netta Eames, born Ninetta Wiley, (1852–1944), American writer
 Netta Engelhardt, Israeli-American theoretical physicist
 Netta Garti (born 1980), Israeli actress
 Netta Elizabeth Gray (1913–1970), American botanist
 Netta Muskett (1887–1963), British romance novelist
 Netta Peacock (1864/7–1938), English art writer and photographer
 Netta Rheinberg (1911–2006), English cricketer, journalist and administrator
 Netta Schreiber (born 1998), Israeli figure skater
 Netta Syrett (1865–1943), English writer

Nickname
 Netta Eames (1852–1944), American writer and magazine editor, early proponent of Jack London
 Johnetta Elzie (born 1989), American civil rights activist

See also

Natta (disambiguation)
Nedda
Nesta (disambiguation)
Neta (disambiguation)
Netra (disambiguation)
Netta (disambiguation)
Nette (disambiguation)
Netti (name)
Netto (surname)
Netty (name)
Nitta (disambiguation)

References